For All Seasons is the debut studio album by the American rapper Nature, released in 2000 via Columbia Records. The album was produced mainly by Trackmasters.

Critical reception

Matt Conaway of AllMusic praised Nature for being "an exceptionally flamboyant and charismatic MC" throughout the record, highlighting "Young Love", "I Remember" and "It's a Man's World" for showcasing his storytelling abilities. He concluded that: "Though he delivers a compelling debut, there are stretches of outdated productions that kept the record from joining the ranks of classic debuts from his borough's now-luminary figures (Run-D.M.C., Rakim, LL Cool J and Nas)." Spin called the album "a crafty platter of metaphysical flair, compelling boy-meets-girl/girl-caps-boy-for-fucking-around narratives, and vivid ghetto reminiscences that recall Nas' early poetics." Vibe contributor David Bry felt that Nature's lyrics were "run-of-the-mill" and had "a profound lack of engaging hooks", concluding that: "Although it offers a brief, pleasant flashback to Cali's hip-hop heydey, For All Seasons fails to live up to contemporary Queensbridge quality. It's a professional but largely uninspired effort."

Track listing

Charts

References

External links

2000 debut albums
Nature (rapper) albums
Columbia Records albums
Albums produced by L.E.S. (record producer)
Albums produced by Ski Beatz
Albums produced by Trackmasters